Collins Hemingway (born January 9, 1950) is an American author.

Hemingway's first book collaboration was with Microsoft founder Bill Gates on the bestselling book Business @ the Speed of Thought. Other projects include Built for Growth with Arthur Rubinfeld.

Early life and education

Hemingway was born and raised in Little Rock, Arkansas. He got his professional start as a part-time sports reporter for the Arkansas Gazette during his senior year of high school. He worked his way through college and graduate school as a journalist, earning a BA in English Literature with a minor in science in 1972 from the University of Arkansas, Phi Beta Kappa, and an MA in English literature from the University of Oregon in 1979.

Career

Hemingway became involved with early minicomputer newspaper technology at the Arkansas Democrat-Gazette between 1974 and 1976. He then joined the editorial staff of the Eugene Register Guard in 1976 in Oregon, where he was instrumental in implementing one of the first all-electronic newsrooms in the U.S.

In 1980 Hemingway joined Oregon Software, a Portland-based software company, as a technical writer and later technical marketer. He then joined WE Communications, where he worked primarily on the Microsoft account. He was recruited by Microsoft in 1992 as director of systems public relations. He became director of business development and international marketing of the Business Systems Division in 1994; and director of executive communications for Gates and company president Steve Ballmer  in 1996. Hemingway's career as a book author launched when he collaborated with Gates on a book about the impact of the internet on business.

Hemingway has co-authored five books and has written a three-volume series that speculates on what could have happened during a seven-year span in which little is known of Jane Austen's life. He has published 17 essays in Austen journals or magazines and speaks regularly at related events.

Books

References

1950 births
Living people
American non-fiction writers
American fiction writers
Microsoft employees